Karin Schnaase  (born 14 February 1985) is a German badminton player. She represented her country at the 2016 Summer Olympics. She placed 2nd in her group during group play and did not advance to the next round. She is well known for the broken shoe incident with Laura Sarosi at the 2016 European Badminton Championships, where Sarosi handed her spare shoe to make Schnaase able to continue the match. Schnaase later won the match which made Sarosi unable to gain more points for Olympic badminton qualification.

Achievements

European Junior Championships
Girls' doubles

BWF Grand Prix
The BWF Grand Prix has two levels, the BWF Grand Prix and Grand Prix Gold. It is a series of badminton tournaments sanctioned by the Badminton World Federation (BWF) since 2007.

Women's singles

 BWF Grand Prix Gold tournament
 BWF Grand Prix tournament

BWF International Challenge/Series
Women's singles

 BWF International Challenge tournament
 BWF International Series tournament
 BWF Future Series tournament

References

External links
 

1985 births
Living people
German female badminton players
Badminton players at the 2016 Summer Olympics
Olympic badminton players of Germany
People from Lüdinghausen
Sportspeople from Münster (region)